Charlotte Kisimba is a Congolese politician. She served as Minister of Public Service in 1970. She was the first woman cabinet minister in Republic of the Congo.

References

Government ministers of the Republic of the Congo
20th-century Republic of the Congo women politicians
Women government ministers of the Republic of the Congo
Living people
Year of birth missing (living people)
Place of birth missing (living people)